Stackhousia spathulata, the coast Stackhousia is a species of plant in the family Celastraceae. A widespread small plant, found in heath and dry sclerophyll forest in sandy areas, often near beaches or lagoons in southeastern Australia. Growing to 50 cm tall. The specific epithet refers to the spoon shaped leaves.

References

Stackhousia
Plants described in 1827
Flora of New South Wales
Flora of Queensland
Flora of Tasmania
Flora of South Australia
Flora of Victoria (Australia)